William Herbert Sheldon, Jr. (November 19, 1898 – September 17, 1977)  was an American psychologist and numismatist. He created the field of somatotype and constitutional psychology that correlate body types with Temperament, illustrated by his Ivy League nude posture photos.

Early life and education
Sheldon was born in Pawtuxet, Rhode Island on November 19, 1898 to William Herbert Sheldon, Sr., a naturalist and animal breeder, and Mary Abby Greene, a village midwife. His godfather was the noted psychologist and philosopher, William James. He graduated from Warwick Veterans Memorial High School in 1915 and attended Brown University. After graduating, he worked in a range of fields before studying for his master's degree at the University of Colorado. Sheldon attended the University of Chicago and earned his Ph.D. in 1925. He taught psychology at the University of Chicago and at the University of Wisconsin. He attended the University of Chicago Medical Center, receiving his M.D. in 1933.

Gaining a two-year fellowship in Europe allowed him to study under Carl Jung, and visit Sigmund Freud and Ernst Kretschmer. After Europe, he moved to Harvard University in 1938. He served in the Army Medical Corps at lieutenant colonel rank in the Second World War.

From 1947 to 1959 he was Director of the Constitutional Laboratory at the Columbia University College of Physicians and Surgeons. He became a professor of medicine at the University of Oregon Medical School in 1951.

Work

In psychology, he developed a new version of somatotypology by classifying people into endomorphic, mesomorphic, and ectomorphic types, based on many photographs and measurements of nude figures at Ivy League schools. Ron Rosenbaum writes: "He believed that every individual harbored within him different degrees of each of the three character components. By using body measurements and ratios derived from nude photographs, Sheldon believed he could assign every individual a three-digit number representing the three components, components that Sheldon believed were inborn -- genetic -- and remained unwavering determinants of character regardless of transitory weight change. In other words, physique equals destiny."

Sheldon also argued that physique was closely correlated with temperamental viscerotonic patterns that powerfully influenced attitudes to food, comfort and luxury, ceremoniousness, sociability, nostalgia, pain, and a great variety of other aspects of human experience.  Aldous Huxley took a considerable interest in and popularized knowledge of Sheldon's work, writing that "Sheldon has worked out what is, without question, the best and most adequate classification of human differences,"  and Sheldon's concepts influenced Huxley's understanding of himself, friends and family, characters in his own work and the work of others, various historical figures, and even entire schools of philosophy and religions.

In numismatics, William Sheldon authored Early American Cents and later revised that work within Penny Whimsy (these were the most exhaustive catalogues of the varieties of early American large cents at that time).  The Sheldon variety list for Early American Cents is still in use today.  He also developed the "Sheldon scale" that graded coins on a numeric basis from 1 to 70, which is still standard among American numismatists.

Allegations of theft, and posthumous suits
William Herbert Sheldon was also a specialist in United States cents.   After his death, he was accused by the American Numismatic Society (ANS) of substitution of lower grade examples of his cent coins with high grade examples from the cabinets of the ANS.

Death
Sheldon died in  his office at the Biological Humanics Center in Cambridge, Massachusetts on September 17, 1977.

Publications
Sheldon, William H. ♦ Psychology and the Promethean Will ♦ Harper & Brothers, 1936
Sheldon, William H. ♦ The Varieties of Human Physique (An Introduction to Constitutional Psychology) ♦ Harper & Brothers, 1940
Sheldon, William H. ♦ The Varieties of Temperament (A Psychology of Constitutional Differences) Harper & Brothers, 1942
Sheldon, William H. ♦ Varieties of Delinquent Youth (An Introduction to Constitutional Psychiatry) Harper & Brothers, 1949
Sheldon, William H. ♦ Early American Cents, 1793–1814 ♦ Harper & Brothers, 1949
Sheldon, William H. ♦ Atlas of Men ♦ Harper and Brothers, 1954
Sheldon, William H. ♦ Penny Whimsy ♦ Harper & Row, 1958

See also
 Ivy League nude posture photos
 Posture (psychology)
 Somatotype and constitutional psychology

References

Further reading
 Gardner, Theories of personality (John Wiley & Sons Inc, 1959), pp. 336-377 (Sheldon's constitutional psychology.) - includes biography of Sheldon
 Physique as Destiny: William H. Sheldon, Barbara Honeyman Heath and the Struggle for Hegemony in the Science of Somatotyping
 "The varieties of Temperament", Harper & Brothers Publishers, 1942. downloadable versions: https://archive.org/details/TheVarietiesOfTemperamentAPsychologyOfConstitutionalDifferences

20th-century American psychologists
American eugenicists
American numismatists
Anthropometry
1898 births
1977 deaths
People from Warwick, Rhode Island
Brown University alumni